Gilvan de Pinho Tavares (Sabinópolis-MG — January 22, 1940) is a Brazilian former lawyer. He serves as ex-president of the association football team Cruzeiro Esporte Clube.

Early life 
He is the son of Agenor de Pinho Tavares and Maria Flor de Maio Pimenta Barroso.

Career 
He became president in December 2011 for the 2012-2014 triennium. Gilvan played for Cruzeiro in the youth category during 1956.

As president, Tavares affected a few cases in Cruzeiro, involving Walter Montillo with other Brazilian teams, specially Corinthians and São Paulo FC.

References

20th-century Brazilian lawyers
Living people
1940 births
Cruzeiro Esporte Clube directors and chairmen
People from Belo Horizonte